Acratocnus is an extinct genus of ground sloths that were found on Cuba, Hispaniola (today the Dominican Republic and Haiti), and Puerto Rico.

Classification 
Like all of the Antillean sloths, Acratocnus was formerly thought on the basis of morphological evidence to be a member of the family Megalonychidae, which was also thought to include Choloepus, the two-toed tree sloths. Recent molecular evidence has clarified that Caribbean sloths represent a separate basal branch of the sloth radiation, now placed in the family Megalocnidae.

Location 
Fossils of Acratocnus were found on the islands of Puerto Rico, Cuba, and Hispaniola, where they inhabited the montane forests of the highlands. The Puerto Rican ground sloth, Acratocnus odontrigonus is known from several poorly documented cave excavations in northwestern Puerto Rico. The various species are regarded as being semi-arboreal because of their (relatively speaking) small size and their large hooked claws.

Size 

Extinction 
As with many sloth fossils, these species of sloth have not been radiometrically dated. It is suggested that the Puerto Rican and Hispaniolan Acratocnus species survived into the late Pleistocene but disappeared by the mid-Holocene. The related Cuban ground sloth, Megalocnus rodens, survived until at least c. 6600 BP, and the latest survival reported for any of the Antillean sloths is c. 5000 BP, for the Hispaniolan Neocnus comes, based on AMS radiocarbon dating. The cause(s) of their extinctions may have been climatic changes, or more likely, human hunting by the indigenous peoples of the Caribbean.

See also 

 Pilosans of the Caribbean

References 

Prehistoric sloths
Prehistoric placental genera
Pleistocene xenarthrans
Pleistocene first appearances
Pleistocene extinctions
Rancholabrean
Pleistocene Caribbean
Mammals of the Caribbean
Extinct animals of Cuba
Extinct animals of the Dominican Republic
Extinct animals of Haiti
Mammals of the Dominican Republic
Mammals of Haiti
Mammals of Cuba
Fossils of Puerto Rico
Fossils of Cuba
Fossils of the Caribbean
Fossils of the Dominican Republic
Mammals of Puerto Rico
Fossil taxa described in 1916